Dr. Ilhi Synn is a South Korean academic, and the President of Keimyung University from 1988–2004 and 2008–present.  As president, he transformed the school from a small college to a major university with over 24,000 students.  In 2007, Dr. Synn received the National Award of Korea for Lifetime Achievement. In 2011, Dr. Synn was awarded the Commander's Cross of the Order of Merit of the Federal Republic of Germany for his commitment to enhance Korea-German relations.

Early life
Synn initially studied in the United States at Kent School in Kent, Connecticut, graduating in 1958.  He received his bachelor's degree from Trinity College in 1962 and was a fellow at University of Heidelberg in 1965. He received a Ph.D. in Germanic languages and literature from Princeton University in 1966 after completing a doctoral dissertation titled "The ironic Rebel in the early dramatic works of Ernst Barlach."

References

Living people
Keimyung University people
Kent School alumni
Princeton University alumni
Commanders Crosses of the Order of Merit of the Federal Republic of Germany
South Korean academics
Trinity College (Connecticut) alumni
Year of birth missing (living people)